Raymond Lee Lathan (1915–1996) was an American politician who served in the Wisconsin State Assembly.

Biography
Lathan was born on April 4, 1915, in Birmingham, Alabama. He graduated from Industrial High School before attending theological seminary. He graduated from Selma University Theological Seminary and from Detroit School of Ministry. Lathan was pastor of New Hope Baptist Church in Milwaukee and was involved in the Civil Rights Movement. He died on May 29, 1996, in Milwaukee, Wisconsin.

Career
Lathan was elected to the Assembly in 1962. He was a Democrat.

References

Politicians from Birmingham, Alabama
Politicians from Milwaukee
Democratic Party members of the Wisconsin State Assembly
1915 births
1996 deaths
20th-century American politicians
African-American politicians